Peng Junxian (born 4 January 1997) is a Chinese footballer, currently playing as a midfielder for Beijing BSU.

Career statistics

Club
.

References

External links
 

1997 births
Living people
Chinese footballers
Chinese expatriate footballers
Association football midfielders
China League One players
Guangzhou F.C. players
Beijing Sport University F.C. players
Chinese expatriate sportspeople in Portugal
Expatriate footballers in Portugal
21st-century Chinese people